Charles Hawley (June 15, 1792 – February 27, 1866) was an American politician, judge, and the 36th Lieutenant Governor of Connecticut from 1838 to 1842.

Early life
Hawley was born in that part of Huntington, Connecticut, which now constitutes the town of Monroe. He graduated with honor at Yale College in 1813. He studied law, partly at Newtown with Hon. Asa Chapman, soon after a judge at the Supreme Court, and partly at Litchfield with Judge Gould. He was admitted to the bar in Fairfield County, Connecticut, in 1815 or early 1816, and opened an office in Stamford. After a brief time in East Haddam, he returned to Stamford and remained there for the rest of his life. In 1824, he was appointed Judge of Probate for the district of Stamford, a district which then embraced many towns, an office which he held until 1838.

In 1821, he married Mary Stiles Holly, with whom he had children, most of whom survived him. He was a firm believer in the Christian religion and a member of the Congregational Church in Stamford.

Political career
Hawley repeatedly represented the town of Stamford in the Connecticut House of Representatives and was also a member of the Connecticut Senate representing the 12th District. As a Whig, he held the office of Lieutenant Governor of Connecticut for four periods, from May 2, 1838 until May 4, 1842, while William W. Ellsworth was Governor of the state.

He died in Stamford on February 27, 1866, aged 74.

References 
 Memorials of Connecticut Judges and Attorneys, Charles Hawley as printed in the Connecticut Reports, volume 32, pages 598–600
 Brief Descriptions of Connecticut State Agencies: Lieutenant Governor

External links
 Yale Obituary Record
 

1792 births
1866 deaths
Connecticut state senators
Connecticut Whigs
19th-century American politicians
Lieutenant Governors of Connecticut
Members of the Connecticut House of Representatives
Politicians from Stamford, Connecticut
Yale College alumni
People from Monroe, Connecticut